Jonathan Wray (born 19 May 1970) is an English former rugby union and professional rugby league footballer who played in the 1990s and 2000s.

Background
Jon Wray's birth was registered in Leeds district, West Riding of Yorkshire, England.

Playing career

Challenge Cup Final appearances
Jon Wray played , i.e. number 2, in Castleford's 12-28 defeat by Wigan in the 1992 Challenge Cup Final during the 1991–92 season at Wembley Stadium, London on Saturday 2 May 1992, in front of a crowd of 77,386.

Club career
Jon Wray was transferred from Morley R.F.C. to Castleford on 24 October 1990.

References

External links
Jon Wray Memory Box Search at archive.castigersheritage.com
Wray Memory Box Search at archive.castigersheritage.com

1970 births
Living people
Castleford Tigers players
English rugby league players
English rugby union players
Hull Kingston Rovers players
Morley R.F.C. players
Rugby league players from Leeds
Rugby league wingers
Rugby union players from Leeds
Wakefield Trinity players